Max Marzorati (born 17 July 2000) is a British racing driver, competing in the GB4 Championship for Hillspeed.

Career

Renault UK Clio Cup 
Marzorati started his car racing career in the 2017 edition of the Renault UK Clio Cup. Driving for Team Pyro, the Brit achieved three victories, winning his first ever car race and with 153 points he finished 3rd in the junior class.

Lower formulae 
In 2018, Marzorati made a switch to the single-seater scene, competing in various Formula Ford events, such as the Formula Ford Festival. He spent two years in the category, but would do selected rounds and events. In his first year he won the last chance race that got him into the festival final. In his second year he had two podiums at the champion of Brands after leading the majority of both races. He then qualified on the front row at the festival in 2019 when contact with another driver dropped him back, he recovered to finish 11th in the final.

BRDC British Formula 3 Championship 
In 2020, the Brit progressed to the BRDC British Formula 3 Championship with JHR for two rounds and then moved to CDR for the final two rounds. with a best race finish of eighth in the first race of round three at Donnington.

The following year Marzorati returned to the series, teaming up with Ayrton Simmons at CDR. Max had a highest place of 2nd and had a puncture whilst fighting for the lead at the sixth round at Silverstone. He again only competed in half the rounds.

Racing record

Career summary 

* Season still in progress.

Complete BRDC British Formula 3 Championship results
(key) (Races in bold indicate pole position) (Races in italics indicate fastest lap)

* Season still in progress.

Complete GB4 Championship results 
(key) (Races in bold indicate pole position) (Races in italics indicate fastest lap)

References

External links 

 

2000 births
Living people
British racing drivers
BRDC British Formula 3 Championship drivers
Formula Ford drivers
JHR Developments drivers
Chris Dittmann Racing drivers
Renault UK Clio Cup drivers
GB4 Championship drivers